The Union Concert Hall, Odesa is a public concert hall in Odesa, Ukraine built by the Mutual Association of Jewish clerks.

History 

It was designed by architects F. A. Troupyansky and A. R. Reyhenberg in 1901–1902. In 1899 David Tarnopol, head of the Society (1894–1905), decided to construct a more capacious building for the Association. In the same year he purchased a large plot of land on the corner of Trinity and Alexander street. 

The project involved the construction of a building with rooms for classrooms, libraries, reading rooms and a concert hall. On 8 September 1902 the structure was consecrated. 

The cost of construction was 222,173,134 rubles, while the value of domestic equipment was 9267.97 rubles.

Performances 

Composer Alexander Scriabin performed from 6–9 December 1911. At a literary evening on March 19, 1925 poets Svetlov M., M. Hungry and writer Yugov A. appeared.

Further reading
Пилявский В.А. Здания, сооружения, памятники Одессы и их зодчие. — 2-е изд. — Одесса: Optimum, 2010. — 276 с. — .

Buildings and structures in Odesa
Jews and Judaism in Odesa
Concert halls in Ukraine